Florent Claude (born 11 November 1991) is a French-born Belgian biathlete.

Biography
Florent Claude is originally a French biathlete, born in Remiremont, in the Vosges, in 1991. He has a Master in physical training from the Université Grenoble Alpes. Due to a lack of chances to compete at the highest biathlon level in France, he relocated to Belgium, where he formed a team with Michael Rösch, another naturalized experienced biathlete (Olympic gold medal in the relay in 2006 with Germany). In June 2017 Claude acquired the Belgian nationality. His brothers Fabien Claude and Emilien Claude are also biathletes and compete for France.

In 2018, Claude competed at the 2018 Winter Olympics with Michael Rösch as the first Belgian Olympic biathletes ever. Their relay teammate Thierry Langer also competed but as a cross-country skier, not a biathlete. The Belgian biathlon relay team did not qualify for the Olympics.

Biathlon results
All results are sourced from the International Biathlon Union.

Olympic Games

*The mixed relay was added as an event in 2014.

World Championships

*During Olympic seasons competitions are only held for those events not included in the Olympic program.
**The single mixed relay was added as an event in 2019.

Results
2nd at the Junior World Championships in the 10 km sprint event (2012)
1st (2009) and 2nd (2010) at the Junior World Championships in the relay event with the French team
3rd at the French championships 2016 in the sprint and pursuit events
4 titles at the Belgian championships: 3 in biathlon and one in cross-country skiing (2017)
9th in the 10 km sprint event at the 2018 European Championships

Notes

External links
 
 
 
 
 

1991 births
People from Remiremont
French male biathletes
Belgian male biathletes
Olympic biathletes of Belgium
Biathletes at the 2018 Winter Olympics
Biathletes at the 2022 Winter Olympics
Living people
Naturalised citizens of Belgium
Sportspeople from Vosges (department)